The Chondon (Çondoon) is a river in Ust-Yansky District, Sakha Republic (Yakutia), Russia.

The Chondon mammoth was discovered in 2013 in the Chondon basin, at the feet of the Polousny Range, 66 km south-west of the village of Tumat. It had died at the age of 47 to 50 years.

Course 
It flows roughly northwards west of the Yana River across the Yana-Indigirka Lowland meandering strongly among marshy areas and lakes. In its lower course it flows parallel to the Sellyakh in the east. Yarok Island lies across its mouth, in the Chondon Bay, by the Yana Bay of the Laptev Sea. 

The river freezes yearly between early October and early June.

Tributaries

Fauna
Among the fish species found in the river, muksun, nelma, omul and vendace deserve mention.

See also
List of rivers of Russia

References

 
Rivers of the Sakha Republic